Sir Anthony Paulet (1562–1600) of Hinton St George, Somerset, was Governor of Jersey from 1588 until his death in 1600.

Origins
He was born at Hinton St George, Somerset the eldest son of Sir Amias Paulet (1532–1588) by his wife Margaret Hervey.

Youth
Anthony accompanied his father to Paris where Amyas was Ambassador. In 1579 Amyas took into his household as a tutor, Jean Hotman (1552–1636), (later Marquis de Villers-St-Paul) son of the famous author and professor of law Francis Hotman, to instruct his two sons Anthony and George.  When Amias was recalled in November 1579, Hotman accompanied the family back to England and lived with his two pupils at Oxford.

Career
He graduated as a Master of Arts at Oxford and eventually succeeded his father as Governor of Jersey.

Marriage and children
In 1583 Anthony married Catherine Norris, daughter of Henry Norris, 1st Baron Norreys, by whom he had three children:
John Poulett, 1st Baron Poulett (born c. 1585), only surviving son, elevated to the peerage in 1627.
Susan Poulett (d.1673), wife of Sir Peter Prideaux, 2nd Baronet (1596–1682) of Netherton, Farway in Devon.
Margery Poulett, wife of John Sydenham of Combe, Dulverton, Somerset, by whom she had 4 daughters.

Landholdings
He held the manor of East Lydford.

Death and burial
Anthony died on 22 July 1600 and was buried in St George's Church, Hinton St George.

References

Posthumus Meyjes, G.H.M., Jean Hotman's English Connection. 1990. 62 pp. 

1562 births
1600 deaths
Governors of Jersey
People from South Somerset (district)
16th-century English people
Anthony
Burials at the Poulett mausoleum, Church of St George (Hinton St George)